Saint-Merd may refer to several places in central France:
Saint-Merd-la-Breuille
Saint-Merd-de-Lapleau
Saint-Merd-les-Oussines